The Lamar Lady Cardinals soccer team represents Lamar University in NCAA Division I college soccer.  The team, currently led by head coach Nathan Kogut, competes in the Southland Conference. The team's initial season was 2007.  The Lady Cardinals' home stadium is the Lamar Soccer Complex located on the university's campus.  The team began playing home games there starting with the 2009 season.  The Lady Cardinals home stadium for the first two seasons was Cardinal Stadium now named Provost Umphrey Stadium.

History
Lamar University first sponsored soccer in 2007.  The team has had five head coaches since its beginning.
 P. Matthew "Mat" Dillon, the first head coach, led the Lady Cardinals in their initial season, 2007.  
 Dewi Hardman served as head coach from 2008 to 2011.  Under Hardman, the Lady Cardinals improved from eighth place in 2008 to a third place conference finish and second conference tournament appearance in 2011.  
 Orlando Cervantes led the Lady Cardinals from 2012 to 2015.  The team finished 2012 with a second-place finish in conference and runner-up in the conference tournament.  
 Steve Holeman was head coach for six seasons (2016-2021).  While at Lamar, Holeman completed his second season with the Lady Cardinals in 2017 with three firsts for the team.  The Lady Cardinals won the Southland Conference regular season championship, the Southland Conference tournament championship, and participated in the NCAA Division I Women's Soccer Tournament for the first time in program history.  The Lady Cardinals lost their first NCAA Division I tournament match 0–1 in an on goal play.  In 2019, the Lady Cardinals repeated winning the Southland Conference regular season championship, the Southland Conference tournament, and participated in the NCAA tournament losing to 14th ranked UCLA 1–4.  Holeman was named Southland Conference women's soccer coach of the year in 2017 and 2019.
 Nathan Kogut, was named head coach on April 20, 2022, replacing Steve Holeman who resigned in February, 2022 to become head coach for the Texas State team. Kogut was named Southland Conference coach of the year in 2022.  In Kogut's first year with the Cardinals, the Lady Cardinals won the Southland Conference regular season and the 2022 Southland Conference women's soccer tournament championship.  They returned to the NCAA Division I women's soccer tournament for the third time losing to LSU 1-3.

Stadium
Construction on the Lamar Soccer Complex began in June, 2009.  The first match at the stadium was against the New Mexico State Aggies on September 25, 2009.  Approximate field dimensions are 115 yards x 70 yards.  The stadium has permanent bleacher seating for 500.  Covered benches are available for both teams.  The stadium is equipped with lighting, an electronic score board, programmable irrigation, and a fertilization system.  The Lamar Soccer and Softball Complex building, approximately 10,000 sq ft in size, is located between the soccer stadium and the Lamar Softball Complex.  It has locker rooms for home and visitors, training facilities, and coaches' offices for both sports.  It also has ticketing and concessions. The 2014 and 2018 Southland Conference Women's Soccer Tournaments were held at the stadium.

Cardinal Stadium, now named Provost Umphrey Stadium following a major renovation, was the home field for the team's initial 2 seasons (2007 and 2008).

Current roster
as of 2022

Players
Source:

Coaching Staff
Source:

NCAA Year-by-year results
Source:

(Results reflect games through Nov 11, 2022.)

Post season appearances

Lamar Lady Cardinals in the NCAA Tournament
The NCAA Division I Women's Soccer Tournament started in 1982.
The format of the tournament has changed through the years.

Conference Tournaments
Sources:

Awards and honors 
Sources:

All American 
 Esther Okoronkwo 2020 (3rd)

All Region 
 Lucy Ashworth 2017 (3rd), 2019 (1st)
 Christine Kitaru 2021 (3rd)
 Madison Ledet 2020 (2nd)
 Sophia Manibo 2020 (2nd)
 Esther Okoronkwo 2019 (1st), 2020 (1st)
 Kelso Peskin 2018 (3rd)
 Juana Plata 2019 (3rd)

Southland Conference

All Conference First Team 
 Jordan Mulnix 2015
 Marie Lund 2017
 M. J. Ekart 2017
 Kelso Peskin 2017, 2018
 Lucy Ashworth 2017, 2019
 Juliana Ocampo 2018
 Juana Plata 2019
 Anna Loftus 2019
 Esther Okoronkwo 2019
 Madison Ledet 2020
 Arely Alaniz 2022
 Cariel Ellis 2022
 Kaisa Juvonen 2022
 Kristine Kitaru 2022
 Nicole Panis 2022
 Isela Ramirez 2022

Player of the Year 
 Lucy Ashworth 2019
 Esther Okoronkwo 2020

Newcomer of the Year 
 Kelso Peskin 2017
 Esther Okoronkwo 2019

Defender of the Year 
 Arely Alaniz 2022

Forward of the Year 
 Lucy Ashworth 2019
 Esther Okoronkwo 2020

Goalkeeper of the Year 
Nicole Panis 2022

Midfielder of the Year 
 Juliana Ocampo 2018
 Madison Ledet 2020

Coach of the Year 
 Steve Holeman 2017, 2019
 Nathan Kogut 2022

Yearly attendance 

Below is the Lady Cardinals' yearly home attendance since program inception.

The attendance record of 702 was set vs Incarnate Word on September 30, 2022.
 Stadium capacity limited due to COVID19 restrictions.

2021 Lamar Lady Cardinals soccer team

The 2021 Lamar Lady Cardinals soccer team represented Lamar University during the 2021 NCAA Division I women's soccer season.  The Lady Cardinals were led by head coach Steve Holeman, in his sixth season. They played home games at Lamar Soccer Complex.  This was the team's 15th season playing organized women's college soccer, and their 1st playing in the Western Athletic Conference.  The Lady Cardinals finished the season in second place in the WAC Southwest division, 10–8–2 overall, and 5–2–2 in divisional play.  The team won its first round match against New Mexico State 1–0 in the Western Athletic Conference women's soccer tournament.  The team's season ended with a loss to Grand Canyon 0–1 in the tournament semi–final round.

Note: Stadium capacity restrictions continued during the season due to Covid-19 precautions.

Previous season 

The Lady Cardinals finished 8–4–0 overall and 7–3–0 in 2020 Southland Conference play to finish second in the conference.  Their season ended with a first round loss in the 2020 Southland Conference Women's Soccer Tournament.

Players
2021 Roster
Source:

Coaching Staff
Source:

Schedule

Source:

|-
!colspan=6 style=""| Exhibition

|-
!colspan=6 style=""| Non-Conference Regular season

|-
!colspan=6 style=""| Western Athletic Conference Regular season

|-
!colspan=6 style=""| Western Athletic Conference Women's Soccer Tournament

2022 Lamar Lady Cardinals soccer team

The 2022 Lamar Lady Cardinals soccer team represents Lamar University during the 2022 NCAA Division I women's soccer season.  The Lady Cardinals are led by head coach Nathan Kogut, in his first season. They play home games at Lamar Soccer Complex.  This is the team's 16th season playing organized women's college soccer, and their 15th playing in the Southland Conference following a brief one year membership in the Western Athletic Conference in 2021–22.  The Lady Cardinals won the Southland Conference regular season championship with a 10-1-1 conference record as well as the 2022 Southland Conference women's soccer tournament for the third time in program history.  They received the conference auto-bid to the 2022 NCAA Division I women's soccer tournament.  The Lady Cardinals' season ended with a 1–3 first round loss to the 8th seeded LSU.  The Lady Cardinals overal record was 15–2–2.

Previous season 

The Lady Cardinals finished 10–8–2 overall and 6–2–2 in 2021 Western Athletic Conference play to finish second in the Southwest Division.  Their season ended losing in the 2021 Western Athletic Conference Women's Soccer Tournament semi-finals.

Preseason poll
The Southland Conference released their preseason poll on August 11, 2022. The Cardinals were picked to finish third in the conference.

Players
Source:

Coaching Staff
Source:

Schedule

Source:

|-
!colspan=6 style=""| Exhibition

|-
!colspan=6 style=""| Non-Conference Regular season

|-
!colspan=6 style=""| Southland Conference Regular season

|-
!colspan=6 style=""| SLC Tournament

|-
!colspan=6 style=""| NCAA Division I Tournament

References

External links
Lamar Lady Cardinals soccer

 
2007 establishments in Texas
NCAA Division I women's soccer teams